The St. Joseph Catholic Church  is a Roman Catholic parish church in the Roman Catholic Archdiocese of San Antonio, located at 623 East Commerce Street in downtown San Antonio, Texas, United States. The Gothic Revival house of worship was the fourth Catholic parish in the city.

The church is an example of what the Chinese describe as a nail house; when the church refused to sell to a property developer, a large shopping mall was constructed around it.

Parish history

The church occupies the probable second site of the Missión San Antonio de Valero (later known as the Alamo), before it was moved in 1724 to its present location. The cornerstone of the church was laid in 1868, and it was finally completed in 1871.  It served a large and growing community of German immigrants.  In the 1870s, Friar Henry Pfefferkorn, founder of the Liederkranz (male singing choir),  painted the Annunciation and Assumption murals on the side altars.  A steeple was added in 1898. Stained glass windows, imported from the Emil Frei Art Glass Factory in Munich were installed in 1902.

In 1944, Joske's department store (whose site would eventually become part of the Shops at Rivercenter complex) offered to buy the church grounds in order to develop it commercially. Parishioners unanimously refused the offer to move from the site and so instead Joske's built around the three sides of the church, earning the church from locals the moniker "St. Joske's". A restoration was commenced in 1981.  Today, the parish serves as home to a multicultural community and as a popular attraction for tourists. Spanish-language masses are held with mariachi music and the San Antonio Liederkranz sings once a month.

See also

National Register of Historic Places listings in Bexar County, Texas
Recorded Texas Historic Landmarks in Bexar County

Bibliography
Notes

References 
 - Total pages: 552 

 - Total pages: 112 

  
 - Total pages: 275 
 - Total pages: 250

External links

St. Joseph Catholic Church on Facebook

Roman Catholic churches in San Antonio
German-American culture in Texas
Roman Catholic churches in Texas
Real estate holdout
Churches on the National Register of Historic Places in Texas
National Register of Historic Places in San Antonio
Recorded Texas Historic Landmarks